Società Sportiva Dilettantistica Manzanese is an Italian association football club, based in Manzano, Friuli-Venezia Giulia.  Manzanese currently plays in Serie D.

The club was founded in 1919.

History
The football history of Manzano can be traced back to the end of the year 1918, beginning of 1919, while the first facility took shape in 1927 in via della Stazione: it is the Luigi Gumini field. In that period the first Associazione Sportiva Manzanese was born, whose first president was Count Guglielmo di Manzano. In 1959 Gastone Fornasarig was elected president, who in 1962 was replaced by Gianfranco Sabot, who was also the team captain. The sporting director was Giuseppe Morigi, who will hold this position for more than 30 years. On 10 October 1976 the Municipal Sports Center in via Olivo was inaugurated, the current headquarters of the company. In the 1977–78 season, the Manzanese won the right to participate in the Promozione (current Eccellenza) under the guidance of Diego Coralli and the presidency of Armando Stacco. In 1978–79 the Manzano club will weave the first foreign footballer, Žarko Rot from the Yugoslav federation. Years, presidents and successes follow one another. In the 1991–92 season the orange won the championship of Eccellenza and the following year they participated in the Serie D: the coach was Andrea Mandorlini, former Verona coach. From the 1993–94 to 2003–04 season the president was Vinicio Sabot. In the 1996–97 season the Manzanese won the FVG Cup with the coach Giovanni Tortolo. In 2004–05, Renato De Sabbata was elected president, who remained in office until the 2007–08 season, replaced by Nelio Taboga, who is still in the saddle. The agreement with Inter for the Soccer School and with Virtus Corno and Villa Vicentina for the youth sector is of great importance. The youth sector alone, among which the series successes of the Juniors stand out at the regional level, consists of about 160 boys aged 5 to 16. A real mine of young talents who have also found outlets in professionalism.

Recent seasons

Key

 Top regional leagues in Friuli-Venezia Giulia (FVG) :
 1959–1969 Prima Categoria (2 groups)
 1969–1991 Promozione (1 group)
 1991–today Eccellenza (1 group)
 Serie D name changes :
 1959–1981 Serie D (more groups)
 1981–1992 Interregionale (more groups)
 1992–2000 Campionato Nazionale Dilettanti (CND) (more groups)
 2000-today Serie D (more groups)

Honours
Eccellenza Friuli-Venezia Giulia
Winners: 1991–92, 2004–05, 2008–09, 2019–20

Coppa Italia Dilettanti Friuli-Venezia Giulia
Winners: 1996–97, 2006–07, 2011–12 , 2019–20

References

External links
Official website 
Municipality of Manzano 

Football clubs in Italy
Football clubs in Friuli-Venezia Giulia
Association football clubs established in 1919
1919 establishments in Italy